Barbecue spaghetti is a dish from Memphis, Tennessee, that combines spaghetti with a sauce made from shredded smoked pork or pulled pork, vegetables, and barbecue sauce. It is served as a side dish in some Memphis barbecue restaurants. Southern Living called the dish iconic and "perhaps the city's most unusual creation". HuffPost called it "a Memphis staple".

Preparation and serving 
Barbecue spaghetti can be made with pulled pork or shredded smoked pork. The sauce is "half marinara and half barbecue sauce", sometimes with onions and peppers included, and is simmered before adding the pork; the consistency is close to that of barbecue sauce. The spaghetti is cooked until soft, then tossed in the hot sauce. This dish is served as a side and sometimes as a main course.

History 
The dish was invented by former railroad cook Brady Vincent, who opened a barbecue restaurant called Brady and Lil's. In 1980 Frank and Hazel Vernon bought the restaurant and renamed it The Bar-B-Q Shop. Vincent also taught the recipe for barbecue spaghetti to Jim Neely, who opened Interstate Bar-B-Q in the late 1970s; Interstate modified the sauce recipe adding the "extra back flap meat" from a rack of ribs and cooking it in a pot with peppers and onions.

State Park restaurant in Cambridge, Massachusetts, serves a "Memphis BBQ spaghetti" that uses pulled pork in a marinara that uses a barbecue sauce as its base.

Similar dishes 
According to John Shelton Reed, "Barbecue spaghetti is to spaghetti Bolognese as Cincinnati chili is to the Tex-Mex variety". Filipino spaghetti is spaghetti sauced with banana ketchup and topped with hot dogs.

See also 

 List of foods of the Southern United States
 List of pasta dishes
 List of pork dishes
 List of regional dishes of the United States
 Cincinnati chili, another example of a fusion-cuisine spaghetti dish
 Filipino spaghetti, another example of a fusion-cuisine spaghetti dish

References 

Barbecue
Cuisine of the Southern United States
Memphis, Tennessee
Spaghetti dishes
American pork dishes
American pasta dishes
Tennessee cuisine